The Life of William Pitt, Earl of Chatham is a two-volume biography of the British eighteenth-century statesman William Pitt, Earl of Chatham. Written by the historian Basil Williams it was originally published in 1913. It has remained a standard work on Pitt, particularly his conduct of strategy during Britain's victory during the Seven Years War.

References

Bibliography
 Middleton, Richard. The Bells of Victory: The Pitt-Newcastle Ministry and Conduct of the Seven Years' War 1757-1762. Cambridge University Press, 2002.

1913 non-fiction books
Books about military history
British non-fiction literature
British biographies